Notable events of 2008 in webcomics.

Events
The website of Plan Nine Publishing went down.

Awards
Web Cartoonist's Choice Awards, "Outstanding Comic" won by Phil and Kaja Foglio's Girl Genius.
Ignatz Awards, "Outstanding Online Comic" won by Chris Onstad's Achewood.
Eagle Awards, "Favourite Web-Based Comic" won by Rich Burlew's The Order of the Stick.
Eisner Awards, "Best Digital Comic" won by Joss Whedon and Fábio Moon's Sugarshock!.
Harvey Awards, "Best Online Comics Work" won by Nicholas Gurewitch' The Perry Bible Fellowship.
Joe Shuster Awards, "Outstanding Webcomic Creator" won by Ryan Sohmer and Lar DeSouza (Least I Could Do and Looking for Group).
The Weblog Awards, "Best Comic Strip" won by Randall Munroe's xkcd.

Webcomics started

 January 1 — Hitlercito by Tormentas and Alejandro Cavallazzi
 January 22 — Yehuda Moon and the Kickstand Cyclery by Rick Smith
 February — Welcome to Convenience Store by Ji kangmin
 February 15 — FreakAngels by Warren Ellis and Paul Duffield
 February 27 — Star Wars: The Old Republic, Threat of Peace by Rob Chestney and Alex Sanchez
 February — Garfield Minus Garfield by Dan Walsh
 March 1 — The Black Cherry Bombshells by  Tony Trov and Johnny Zito
 March 10 — Problem Sleuth by Andrew Hussie
 April 1 — Truth Serum by Jon Adams
 April 23 — Super Effective by Scott Ramsoomair
 May 16 — Ménage à 3 by Gisele Lagace and Dave Lumsdon
 June 13 — Brawl in the Family by Matthew Taranto
 July 26 — Oglaf by Trudy Cooper and Doug Bayne
 July — Order of Tales by Evan Dahm
 July — XDragoon by Felipe Marcantonio
 September 4 — Gunshow by KC Green
 September 21 — Johnny Wander by Ananth Panagariya and Yuko Ota
 October 19 — Sandra and Woo by Oliver Knörzer and Puri Andini
 December 27 — The Meek by Der-Shing Helmer

Webcomics ended
 Ozy and Millie by D. C. Simpson, 1998 – 2008
 The original Cheshire Crossing by Andy Weir, 2006 – 2008
 minus by Ryan Armand, 2006 – 2008
 Rice Boy by Evan Dahm, 2006 – 2008
 A.D.: New Orleans After the Deluge by Josh Neufeld, 2007 – 2008

References

 
Webcomics by year